Model Farm, also known as Swarthmore Farm, is a historic home located at High Point, Guilford County, North Carolina. It was built about 1867, and is a -story, triple-A roofed, side-gabled, L-plan, frame building with 12 rooms.  It is sheathed in weatherboard and sits on a brick foundation.  The front facade has a full width, one-story hip-roofed porch.  The house is associated with an important program of the Quakers to improve agricultural endeavors in the South in the decades after the American Civil War.

It was listed on the National Register of Historic Places in 2011.

References

Buildings and structures in High Point, North Carolina
Houses on the National Register of Historic Places in North Carolina
Houses completed in 1867
Houses in Guilford County, North Carolina
National Register of Historic Places in Guilford County, North Carolina